Irandokht (1915–1984) was a princess of Persia. 

She was the first child of Ahmad Shah Qajar and Badr al-Molouk.  She was princess of Persia before leaving the country with her parents when she was 10 years old, when her father was deposed in 1925.

While Mohammad Reza Pahlavi was in Switzerland for his education, he saw Irandokht and fell in love with her and told his father, Reza Shah about her. After Irandokht's arrival in Tehran, Reza Shah would not allow them to get married. Following his divorce from Fawzia of Egypt, the now-Shah seems to have again considered marrying Irandokht, who was by then also separated from her first husband, but was dissuaded by the fact that she had already had three children. 

Indeed, as she had  returned to Europe, she had married Abbas Faroughy. She is survived by three grandchildren: Mariam, Darius and Cyrus

References

External links

1915 births
1984 deaths
Qajar princesses
20th-century Iranian women